Daryl A. Mundis served as a Senior Trial Attorney at The Hague as a lead prosecutor at the International Criminal Tribunal for the former Yugoslavia.

Education
Mundis received his undergraduate degree from Manhattanville College. While at Manhattanville, Mundis was awarded a Truman Scholarship in his junior year. Following graduation, Mundis attended Columbia University, where he received a Juris Doctor degree. Mundis earned his PhD from the London School of Economics and Political Science in 2008 under the supervision of Christopher Greenwood with a thesis entitled The law of naval exclusion zones.

Career
After law school, Mundis was commissioned as an officer in the United States Navy, where he served as a Judge Advocate General for five years before working in the Hague.

Other activities
 International Gender Champions (IGC), Member

References 

International Criminal Tribunal for the former Yugoslavia prosecutors
Columbia Law School alumni
American lawyers
Living people
Manhattanville College alumni
American officials of the United Nations
Year of birth missing (living people)